Jagdish Singh (Jag) Bhaduria (also variously spelled Badauria or Bhadauria) (born January 23, 1940 in New Delhi, India) is an Indian-Canadian teacher. He served as the Member of Parliament for the Ontario riding of Markham—Whitchurch-Stouffville in the 35th Parliament of Canada, from 1993 to 1997.

Bhaduria was nominated as the Liberal candidate in the riding of Markham and contested the 1988 federal election, placing a distant second to Progressive Conservative incumbent Bill Attewell. In the 1993 election their fortunes reversed, with Bhaduria defeating Attewell by a nearly two to one margin.

In early 1994 a series of controversies emerged, including that he had falsified his educational credentials by using postnominal letters which appeared to indicate he held a law degree, and that he had written threatening letters to his school board after being turned down for promotions. He denied that he lied about his education and apologized for the letters, however the controversies led to him leaving the Liberal caucus. After he declined to give up his seat in Parliament, the Reform Party led a petition drive to have his seat vacated, which was unsuccessful. He served the remainder of his term as an Independent Liberal.

He ran as an independent in the 1997 election, earning less than 4% of the vote.

Parliamentary history and controversies
Bhaduria won the contest to be the Liberal candidate for Markham prior to the 1988 federal election, defeating retired accountant David Wishart for the nomination. He was defeated in the election by Progressive Conservative incumbent Bill Attewell, losing by nearly 15,000 votes.

Prior to the 1993 election, Bhaduria again contested the nomination in the riding which had been renamed Markham—Whitchurch-Stouffville, defeating challenger Mario Racco. As nationwide support for the Progressive Conservatives collapsed to its worst performance in the party's history, Bhaduria this time easily defeated Attewell, winning the riding by a margin of nearly 16,000 votes. He was among the first South Asians elected to the House of Commons, along with Herb Dhaliwal and Gurbax Singh Malhi, all Liberals.

Threatening letter
On January 21, 1994, the Toronto Sun published an article quoting from a threatening letter allegedly written by Bhaduria while a teacher with the Toronto Board of Education. The Sun alleged that Bhaduria sent the letter to Board executives in 1989 after being turned down for a series of vice principal positions. In the letter, Bhaduria allegedly referred to Marc Lépine, the shooter who murdered fourteen young women in the École Polytechnique massacre just a few days before, saying he wished that Lépine had shot the Board executives too. He had been fired from his teaching position over the incident on August 31, 1990.

On January 24, 1994, Bhaduria apologized in the House of Commons, and indicated that he had written letters of apology to the Board executives in 1990. Liberal Prime Minister Jean Chrétien accepted his apology.

False credentials
Days following his apology over the threatening letter, an investigation by CBC Prime Time News revealed discrepancies in Bhaduria's educational credentials. Bhaduria claimed on his resumé to hold a degree of "LLB (Int.)" from the University of London, which was understood to mean a Bachelor of Laws degree in international law. Bhaduria claimed that the initials instead referred to "intermediate", stating that he held a certification of intermediate completion from the University in 1976 but did not hold a law degree, and insisted that he never claimed to be a lawyer. However, the University reported that it did not grant such a certification, and that Bhaduria had withdrawn from the program.

Bhaduria officially resigned from the Liberal caucus on January 27, 1994. On February 15, he spoke in the House of Commons, denying the allegations that he had lied about his credentials or practiced law without qualification, and asked Speaker Gilbert Parent to rule on whether he could continue to sit as a Member of Parliament. On February 23, Parent declined to issue a ruling.

Nomination irregularities
Shortly after he resigned from the Liberal Party, Toronto newsmagazine Eye Weekly published a report on irregularities found in Bhaduria's 1993 nomination papers. Elections Canada requires potential candidates to collect 100 signatures from eligible voters in the riding where they intend to run, however the report found that the list of Liberal Party members who signed Bhaduria's nomination forms included ineligible voters, members listed with incorrect addresses, and members who either were not aware that they were members of the Party or had not paid their membership fees. Nomination candidate Don Gracey also alleged that Bhaduria had submitted forms supporting his own nomination signed by members who thought they were supporting Gracey's.

Petition for recall
The series of controversies led to calls for Bhaduria to resign from Parliament. Eye Weekly quoted Milton Mowbray, President of the Liberal Party for Ontario, explaining that the Party had no power to remove Bhaduria as he had already been elected. The Reform Party seized on the opportunity to call for recall legislation for Canadian politicians. Deputy leader Deborah Grey held a rally in Markham calling for Bhaduria's resignation, and the Reform Party's only MP from Ontario, Ed Holder, submitted a petition to Parliament with 30,000 signatures calling for Bhaduria to be removed from his seat. However, while Parliament can declare a seat vacant and call for a by-election, it had only been done four times in Canadian history, and only for cases of severe misconduct or criminal offences. Bhaduria declined to resign, and served the rest of his term as an Independent Liberal.

1997 election
Bhaduria ran as an independent in the 1997 election, losing badly to Progressive Conservative Jim Jones with under 4% of the vote, while newly-nominated Liberal candidate Gobinder Randhawa finished second with nearly 37%. Their again-renamed riding of Markham was the only one of Ontario's 103 ridings which did not elect a Liberal, other than York South—Weston where incumbent John Nunziata had been expelled from the Liberal caucus a year earlier and won re-election as an independent.

Bhaduria later sued Chrétien and the Liberal Party for $38 million.

Electoral record

Notes

References

External links

1940 births
Living people
Liberal Party of Canada MPs
Independent MPs in the Canadian House of Commons
Members of the House of Commons of Canada from Ontario
Indian emigrants to Canada
Canadian politicians of Indian descent